Prabhashvara is the color of the aura of Gautama Buddha. The actual spectrum of his aura consists of five colors:

Pāli:
 nīla (sapphire blue)
 pīta (golden yellow)
 lohitaka (crimson)
 odāta (white)
 mañjeṭṭha (scarlet)

The mixture of those five colors is believed to be Prabhashvara but it is depicted as separate strips of the five colors.
The flag was originally designed in 1885 by the Colombo Committee, in Colombo, Ceylon (now Sri Lanka). More than two thousand years after Buddha's "parinirvana" to represent the Buddhism as a religion. The prabhashvara means pure or nothingness which cannot be explained in normal languages but there is no other way to convey the message. Due to this reason the Buddha's message has been misinterpreted in books and by monks. But Buddha never preached a religion, it was a vision that cannot be seen with normal eyes. The best example for prabhasvara is an infant whose mind is pure and empty with no data from the external world until he starts collecting information from the outside world which will start after three months from birth when he turns face down. After that his prabhasvara chitta will be full of impurities with all false data.
Upakkele upalkilittang.

See also
Buddhist flag
Five Pure Lights
Parinirvana
Rainbow body

References

Gautama Buddha
Color